Denise "Dee" Caffari MBE (born 23 January 1973) is a British sailor, and in 2006 became the first woman to sail single-handedly and non-stop around the world "the wrong way"; westward against the prevailing winds and currents. In February 2009, Caffari completed the Vendée Globe race and set a new record to become the first woman to sail solo, non-stop, around the world in both directions.

Early life 

Descended from a Maltese sea captain, Caffari grew up in Rickmansworth, Hertfordshire and attended St. Clement Danes School. Caffari studied at Leeds Metropolitan University and became a PE teacher for 5 years before beginning her sailing career.

Caffari trained at UKSA (based in Cowes, Isle of Wight) completing her Yachtmaster course and a range of ocean qualifications. Caffari then worked for Formula 1 Sailing, first as a skipper and then as the manager of their fleet of Farr 65s in the UK and the Caribbean.

Awards 
On 2 December 2006, she was a runner up for BBC South Sports Personality of the Year. She did win the Tenon Yachtsperson of the Year award.

In 2007 she was awarded an MBE for service to sailing.

Shortlisted in 2011 for the World Sailing – Rolex World Sailing of the Year Award

Sailing career

Highlight

Background 

Here initial professional sailing career was spent working for both Sir Robin Knox-Johnson and Sir Chay Blyth sailing adventure companies so her progression into being a round the world sailing pioneer was not a surprise.

Here first round the world voyage canme as skipper of Imagine It. Done in the 2004 Global Challenge Round the World Yacht Race. The Global Challenge was an amateur crew who paid to race around the world with a professional skipper in matching Challenge 72 yachts. The only similar race is Clipper Round the Race but the challenge race went against the prevailing wind conditions and traded under the term "The World Toughest Yacht Race" for this reason. Dee managed one serious situation when a crewmember needed to be airlifted off in the Southern Ocean by the New Zealand Rescue Service due to an abdominal infection.

On 20 November 2005, she set off on her attempt to single-handedly circumnavigate the world against the prevailing winds and currents. She finished on 18 May 2006, at 17:55pm, after 178 days at sea. Her voyage was sponsored by Aviva.

In January 2007 Caffari announced that she would be taking part in the 2008/09 – Vendée Globe singlehanded round the world yacht race, again sponsored by Aviva. In March 2007 she announced a technical partnership with Mike Golding to allow both the British entries in the Vendée Globe to work together.

In December 2007 she had to be rescued by Royal Navy frigate HMS Northumberland after dismasting in severe weather off northwest Spain whilst competing singlehanded in the Transat Ecover B2B Race.

She was a guest skipper on Maiden'''s global voyage in 2018 in support of The Maiden Factor Foundation.

 Role within the Community 

Dee has been an enthusiastic supporter of charities such as Toe in The Water (using competitive sailing to re-inspire injured servicemen), and Sail 4 Cancer.

In October 2011, Dee Caffari accepted the role as the new patron for the charity Gosport and Fareham Inshore Rescue Service which is an independent lifeboat station based in Stokes Bay local to where Dee Caffari lives.

Dee Caffari sits on the Operations Board of the Royal National Lifeboat Institution, and is an Honorary Commander in the Royal Navy.

In 2018 she became the first Chair the World Sailing Trust a World Sailing initiative looking at Marine Health, Youth Development and Access.

In 2021 she was BRIT Ambassador championing the BRIT 2021 Challenge a mental health charity.

Publications

In September 2007, Caffari's autobiography Against the Flow was published by Adlard Coles Nautical.

In March 2009, Caffari's autobiography Against the Flow'' was re-published in paperback with an additional chapter charting the lead up to her Vendee Globe entry and subsequent world record achievement.

References

External links 
 
 

1973 births
Living people
People educated at St. Clement Danes School
English female sailors (sport)
People from Rickmansworth
Members of the Order of the British Empire
Alumni of Leeds Beckett University
English people of Maltese descent
Volvo 65 class sailors
Volvo Ocean Race sailors
IMOCA 60 class sailors
British Vendee Globe sailors
2008 Vendee Globe sailors
Vendée Globe finishers
Single-handed circumnavigating sailors